Antuan Ilgit (born in 1972, Hersbruck, Germany) is a Turkish-Italian Catholic Jesuit priest, and a convert from Sunni Islam.

Biography

Antuan Ilgit is a Jesuit of Turkish descent in the Euro-Mediterranean Province of the Society of Jesus, which he entered in 2005. In 1994, he graduated in Economics and Administration at Gazi University, Ankara, and as an economics graduate, he converted to the Catholic Church. Ilgit was baptised on 29 March 1997, in Saint Teresa of Child Jesus Chapel in Ankara. After the two-year novitiate in Genoa he pronounced his first vows, becoming the first Jesuit of Turkish citizenship. In 2010 ordained a priest by Cardinal Giovanni Layolo at the Gesù Church in Rome, and since 2013 he has dual citizenship, Turkish and Italian.

After earning his Bachelor of Theology at the Pontifical Gregorian University in Rome, he did a year of studies at the Pontifical Oriental Institute and obtained a license in moral theology and bioethics at the Alphonsian Academy. His thesis “A Comparison between Issues Related to the Beginning of Life in Turkish Bioethics and the Teaching of the Catholic Church” considered issues regarding abortion, contraception, IVF, and the use of embryonic stem cells based on research analysing Turkish laws regulating biomedical research, statements of the Union of Turkish Medical Association, and the decisions and studies of the Presidency of Religious Affairs of the Republic of Turkey. He also holds an M.A. in Health Care Ethics from Saint Joseph’s University (Philadelphia, PA). In 2012, he was nominated for membership in Alpha Sigma Nu, the international academic Honor Society of Jesuit Colleges and Universities. After his graduation with distinction, he was nominated for the Alpha Epsilon Lambda National Honor Society - Omega Chapter at the Saint Joseph’s University.
He earned his doctoral degree in Moral Theology at Boston College School of Theology and Ministry (Chestnut Hill, MA) with a dissertation entitled “Muslim and Catholic Perspectives on Disability in the Contemporary Context of Turkey: A Proposal for Muslim-Christian Dialogue” mentored by Rev. James T. Bretzke, S.J., S.T.D.

Fr. Antuan Ilgit is involved in bioethics and interreligious dialogue, and he wants Muslims and Christians to engage one another in the matter. He is currently a Professor-in-Charge of Moral Theology at the Pontifical Theological Faculty of Southern Italy (Naples). A revised version of his doctoral dissertation has been published by Libra Books (Istanbul) in 2017.

References

External links
 Antuan Ilgit's Instagram Page

 https://www.linkedin.com/in/ilgitsj
 http://www.bc.edu/bc-web/bcnews/faith-religion/theology/BC-jesuit-named-FASPE-fellow.html 
 http://www.ihu.unisinos.br/552781-qeu-jesuita-convertido-do-islamismo-ponte-entre-duas-culturasq (in Portuguese)
 http://www.popoli.info/easyne2/Articolo/Il_cammino_di_un_gesuita_turco.aspx
 https://www.avvenire.it/opinioni/pagine/editoriale_padovese_201007030747539000000

1972 births
Converts to Roman Catholicism from Islam
Turkish former Muslims
Turkish Roman Catholic priests
Turkish Jesuits
Living people
Italian people of Turkish descent